Harvey balls are round ideograms used for visual communication of qualitative information. They are commonly used in comparison tables to indicate the degree to which a particular item meets a particular criterion.

For example, in a comparison of products, information such as price or weight can be conveyed numerically, and binary information such as the existence or lack of a feature can be conveyed with a check mark; however, information such as "quality" or "safety" or "taste" is often difficult to summarize in a manner allowing easy comparison – thus, Harvey balls are used.

In addition to their use in qualitative comparison, Harvey balls are also commonly used in project management for project tracking; in lean manufacturing for value-stream mapping and continuous improvement tracking; and in business process modeling software for visualisation.

Harvey L. Poppel is generally credited with inventing Harvey balls in the 1970s while working at Booz Allen Hamilton as head of their worldwide IT consulting practice.

Implementations and support

Scalable Vector Graphics

The use of Scalable Vector Graphics to render Harvey balls allows them to be easily used in web browsers and applications that support the XML vector graphics format. The benefit is that no special font is required and the Harvey balls can be displayed using an open format. The main drawback is that SVG is not universally supported.

Microsoft Excel
Harvey balls are available within Microsoft Excel since Excel 2007.

Custom fonts
Custom fonts have been developed such that the numbers 0–9 map to a particular Harvey ball. Incorporating the Harvey ball into a document then becomes a matter of selecting the number which corresponds to the desired Harvey ball and selecting the custom font. The Harvey balls can then be manipulated like any other font (e.g., color, size, underline) and may be easier to use than other implementations. The main drawback of this approach is that the font either needs to be embedded in the document or all the viewers of the document must have the font installed.

Unicode
The use of Unicode to render Harvey balls depends on whether a font with these characters is installed; the Unicode Harvey balls may be difficult to work with in software that does not render these characters uniformly.

The Unicode set of related symbols includes:

Modifications and other uses

From 1979 through October 2016, Consumer Reports used a modified type of Harvey ball in product ratings and had even incorporated one into its logo.

Some of the symbols used for Harvey balls are also used in other fields to represent other types of information:

See also
 Radar graph, also used for comparisons
 Okta, similar symbols used in meteorology

References

Pictograms
Business terms
Infographics
Booz Allen Hamilton